The Pan Arab Games are a regional multi-sport event held between nations from the Arab world. A men's football tournament has been held at every session of the Games since 1953, except for 2004.


Summaries
The following table gives an overview of medal winners in football at the Pan Arab Games. 1992 Pan Arab Games which overlaps the 1992 Arab Cup.

* The 1992 edition organised as part of the Pan Arab Games, and also counted as Arab Cup.
 A round-robin tournament determined the final standings.
 withdrew

Overall team records
In this ranking 3 points are awarded for a win, 1 for a draw and 0 for a loss. As per statistical convention in football, matches decided in extra time are counted as wins and losses, while matches decided by penalty shoot-outs are counted as draws.  Teams are ranked by total points, then by goal difference, then by goals scored.

Excluding the 1992 Pan Arab Games which overlaps the 1992 Arab Cup.

   Former Countries.

Medal table 

 The 1992 edition organised as part of the Pan Arab Games, is also counted as the sixth edition of the Arab Cup.

Comprehensive team results by tournament
Legend

 – Champions
 – Runners-up
 – Third place

4th – Fourth place
GS – Group stage
q – Qualified
 – Hosts

Notes
1965 Yemen consist of :  Aden &  Lahej
1976 Yemen consist of : 
1985 Yemen consist of :

See also
FIFA Arab Cup

External links 
Pan Arab Games Overview - rsssf.com
Pan Arab Games Overview - mundial11.com

 
Sports at the Pan Arab Games
Union of Arab Football Associations competitions
Pan Arab Games